Henry Wilson (1740–1810) was an English naval captain of the British East India Company, from Rotherhithe. He was in command of the British East India Company packet ship Antelope, when it shipwrecked off Ulong Island, near Koror Island in Palau in 1783, and the East Indiaman Warley at the Battle of Pulo Aura.

Voyage of 1783
The context was the Fourth Anglo-Dutch War; normal routes from China westwards for British shipping were hampered by the Dutch East Indies. The Antelope had been returning from Macau by the "Eastern Passage", a route designed to avoid the south-west monsoon, but had strayed too far in the easterly direction.

On the north coast of New Guinea Wilson anchored in the vicinity of the Schouten Islands. After some dialogue over two days with Papuan inhabitants who came out to the ship, in which Wilson used vocabulary collected by Thomas Forrest at Dory Harbour, Wilson felt the numbers he faced were threatening. He used small arms to deter them, and the crew of the Antelope was attacked, an encounter in which the artist Arthur William Devis was injured. The wreck on Ulong followed.Transactions of the Royal Asiatic Society of Great Britain and Ireland, Volume 3 (1835) p. 129 note;Google Books.

 Although Spain had claimed the islands previously, Wilson's crew made the first sustained contact, which was friendly. One of the crew of the Antelope knew Malay, allowing contact to be made with the ibedul on Koror, whom Wilson treated as a local king, somewhat misapprehending his status, which was more like an elected official.  While his men spent three months rebuilding the ship, Wilson entered an effective alliance with the ibedul in conflicts with Melekeok and others. One of the Antelope's guns proved decisive, shipped in a boat and discharged with powder alone.

Return to England
Prince Lee Boo from Palau returned to England with Wilson and lived with his family in Rotherhithe. Unfortunately, after a few months he died of smallpox in 1784. Much interest in Palau followed. Wilson's collection of curiosities, that were exchanged with the ibedul and form the earliest known group of Palau artefacts, are held by the British Museum.British Museum HighlightsBritish Museum Highlights George Keate wrote an account of Wilson's experiences in 1788, a book heavily influenced by the current conceptions concerning the "noble savage".Richard Lansdown, Strangers in the South Seas: the idea of the Pacific in Western thought: an anthology (2006), p. 99;Google Books. The book became quite popular. "Between 1789 and 1850, more than 20 English and a dozen foreign-language editions were published in different countries." The East India Company turned attention from Mindanao as a possible outpost to the New Guinea archipelago, and John McCluer went from Bombay to Palau in 1790 as hydrographer.

Later life
Later Wilson was captain of the East Indiaman Warley for five voyages. He was captain in 1804 at the Battle of Pulo Aura when a fleet of East Indiamen under Nathaniel Dance fought and bluffed a French squadron. Wilson died on 10 May 1810 at his home in Colyton, Devon.National Maritime Museum page

References

Further reading
Henry Wilson (journal) and George Keate: Account of the Pelew Islands, situated in the western part of the Pacific Ocean. Nicol, Londres 1788; Pissot, Paris 1789 (in English!); G. Nicol, London 1879; Leicester University Press, 2001 
in German: Nachrichten von den Pelew-Inseln, in der Westgegend des Stillen Oceans.'' transl. Georg Forster. Benjamin Gottlob Hoffmann, Hamburg 1789; Süddeutsche Zeitung, Munich 2007, Bibliotheca Anna Amalia,

External links
Palau Explorers
wrecksite.eu
National Maritime Museum – Presentation Sword

1740 births
1810 deaths
History of Palau
British sailors
Shipwreck survivors